These are the international rankings of Turkmenistan

References

Turkmenistan